Baltisk is a crater in the Argyre quadrangle of Mars.  It was named after a town in Russia in 1976.  Baltisk is located on the western edge of the Argyre impact basin.

Impact craters generally have a rim with ejecta around them, in contrast volcanic craters usually do not have a rim or ejecta deposits.  As craters get larger (greater than 10 km in diameter) they usually have a central peak. The peak is caused by a rebound of the crater floor following the impact.

See also

References 

Impact craters on Mars
Argyre quadrangle